Andrii Ivanovych Kholodov (born 20 August 1972) is a Ukrainian businessman and politician currently serving as a People's Deputy of Ukraine in the 9th Ukrainian Verkhovna Rada.

Biography
Andrii Kholodov was born in 1972. Graduated from Kyiv National Transport University (faculty of Automobiles and Automobile Industry).
From 1998 began to do his own business on rental and sales of commercial and residential property, development, business consulting and other types of economic activities. Was held the position of deputy director – director on foreign economic activity in the limited liability company ‘Tekam Plus’.
From 2005 was a co-owner of the factory ‘Efkon-vikna’ that produces an aluminum profile and other metal building structures. In addition, he owns LLC ‘Favorit-M’, registered in Kyiv.

Political activity
Candidate for people’s deputies from the political party ‘Servant of the People’in 2019 parliamentary elections, № 22 on the list. 
From August 29, 2019 – People’s Deputy of Ukraine of the IX convocation. 
Deputy Chairperson of the Verkhovna Rada Committee of Ukraine on Finance, Taxation and Customs Policy.
Member of a group for inter-parliamentary relations with the Republic of Korea.
Member of a group for inter-parliamentary relations with the Republic of Kazakhstan.
Member of a group for inter-parliamentary relations with the United Kingdom of Great Britain and Northern Ireland.
Member of a group for inter-parliamentary relations with the United States of America.

Family
Married

Criticism and a lawsuit 
In November 2019, journalists of the Schemes program of the Ukrainian edition of Radio Liberty published an investigation in which they proved that MP Kholodov's family was connected to the cigarette distribution business, pointed to possible tax violations, and exposed him for lobbying the Verkhovna Rada to improve the conditions for doing business. 

In July 2020, the NACP found a real conflict of interest in MP Kholodov, the case was referred to court, and the MP faces a fine.

On August 27, 2020, Kholodov filed a lawsuit with the Shevchenkivskyi District Court of Kyiv, asking to "recognize as unreliable the information" disseminated in the investigation. However, on the day of the first preparatory hearing, he filed a written statement "to leave the claim without consideration." Neither Kholodov nor his representative appeared at the hearing. On March 25, 2021, the Shevchenkivskyi Court decided to "leave the claim without consideration".

References

External links
 Parliament of Ukraine, official web portal

1972 births
Living people
21st-century Ukrainian businesspeople
People from Kremenchuk
Politicians from Kyiv
Ukrainian People's Party politicians
Servant of the People (political party) politicians
Ninth convocation members of the Verkhovna Rada
21st-century Ukrainian politicians